The Massachusetts Automatic Gas Tax Increase Repeal Initiative, Question 1 was on the November 4, 2014 statewide ballot. Approved by voters, the measure repeals a 2013 law that would automatically adjust gas taxes according to inflation, allowing for automatic annual increases in the state's gas tax.

The law that this initiative repeals would also have put a minimum cap on gas taxes to prevent gas tax decreases in the case of deflation. The tax increase was part of a transportation funding package that was vetoed by Governor Deval Patrick (D) because he wanted an even greater tax increase.  Patrick's veto was overruled by a House vote of 123 to 33 and a Senate vote of 35 to 5.

Tank the Gas Tax, an organization supporting the initiative, stated that they collected at least 18,500 signatures by June 9, 2014. They turned in the signatures on June 18, 2014 in an attempt to qualify the initiative for the ballot. The measure was certified for the 2014 ballot on July 2, 2014.

The question passed with 53% of voters in favor.

Text of measure

Ballot summary

Full text

Background

State gas tax
In 2013, the Democrat-controlled state legislature passed House Bill 3847, which raised the state's gas tax from 21 to 24 cents per gallon and automatically tied the tax rate to inflation for future years, meaning it would increase by the same annual percentage as the Consumer Price Index (CPI). This marked the first increase in the tax since 1991. Given that the CPI has averaged approximately one or two percent during the past several years, the tax would likely increase by half a penny or less per year.

Voter guide summary

Support
The measure is sponsored by the group Tank the Gas Tax.

Supporters

Officials
State Rep. Geoff Diehl (R-7)
State Rep. Kevin Kuros (R-8)
State Rep. Ryan Fattman (R-18)
State Rep. Shaunna O'Connell (R-3)
State Rep. Jim Lyons (R-18)

Individuals
Jeffrey T. Kuhner, President of the Edmund Burke Institute for American Renewal
Bill Vernon, Director and National Federation of Independent Business Massachusetts

Arguments
Tank the Gas Tax deemed the tax a slippery slope.

Campaign contributions

As of October 30, 2014, one campaign organization had received an aggregate total of $94,318 in contributions.

PAC info:

Top contributors:

Opposition
The official opposition campaign is called Vote No on Question One, in conjunction with the Committee for Safer Roads and Bridges.

Opponents
Governor Deval Patrick (D)
 Medford Mayor Michael J. McGlynn
 Committee for Safer Roads and Bridges
 Kristina Egan, Director of Transportation for Massachusetts

Arguments

Campaign contributions
As of October 30, 2014, one campaign organization had received an aggregate total of $1,884,722 in contributions.

PAC info:

Top contributors:

Media editorial positions

Support
 The Worcester Telegram & Gazette recommended a "yes" vote.

Opposition
 The Boston Globe advocated a "no" vote.

Polls

External links

Basic information
Text of the Automatic Gas Tax Increase Repeal Initiative
 Online poll: Do you think the gas tax should be repealed
 Secretary of State guide to state ballot measures
 Massachusetts 2014 Voter Guide

Support
 Tank the Gas Tax website
 Tank the Automatic Gas Tax Facebook page
 Conservative Focus website

Opposition
 Vote No on Question One
 Boston Herald, "Gov. Patrick lashes out at push to repeal gas tax law," December 2, 2013
 PatriotLedger.com, "Patrick: Don’t repeal automatic gas tax hikes," December 2, 2013

Further reading
 WCVB.com, "Massachusetts ballot question to target gas tax increases," August 6, 2013

References

2014 Massachusetts ballot measures
Transportation ballot measures in the United States